Zhou Lei (born 25 October 1994) is a Chinese handball player for Shanghai Handball and the Chinese national team.

She represented China at the 2019 World Women's Handball Championship in Japan, where the Chinese team placed 23rd.

References

Chinese female handball players
1994 births
Living people